Changyang railway station is a railway station on the Yichang–Wanzhou Railway in Hubei Province of China. It is located in Hejiaping town in Changyang Tujia Autonomous County of Yichang Prefecture-level City. It apparently was identified in early design documents as the Hejiaping  Railway Station.

Structure

Service

History
A comparatively minor station, the Changyang station was opened on October 18, 2012, almost two years after the Yiwan Railway itself was opened. Two passenger trains from Wuhan stop here.

Nearby stations

Notes

Railway stations in Hubei